The Prisăcina is a right tributary of the river Cerna in Romania. It flows into the Cerna near Cracu Mare.

References

Rivers of Romania
Rivers of Caraș-Severin County